Marc Roca Barceló (born 21 January 1988) is a water polo player from Spain. He was part of the Spanish team at the 2016 Summer Olympics, where the team finished in seventh place.

References

Spanish male water polo players
Living people
1988 births
Olympic water polo players of Spain
Water polo players at the 2016 Summer Olympics
21st-century Spanish people